Wariri (Aymara wari vicuña, -(i)ri a suffix, Hispanicized spelling Huarire, also Huairire) is a mountain in the Andes of southern Peru, about  high. It is located in the Tacna Region, Tarata Province, Susapaya District. Wariri lies between the lake Wilaquta in the north and Ñiq'i Quta ("mud lake") in the south.

See also 
 Churi Qullu

References

Mountains of Tacna Region
Mountains of Peru